The National University of Life and Environmental Sciences of Ukraine is a leading public university in the field of agriculture in Ukraine; it is located in Kyiv.

Established in 1898, prior to 1992 the institution was named the Ukrainian Agricultural Academy. In the years 1992–2008 it went by the name of National Agricultural University.

Notable alumni  
 Trofim Lysenko, Soviet agronomist and biologist, proponent of Lysenkoism.
 Anatoly Shvidenko, Doctor of Sciences, Senior research scholar at the International Institute for Applied Systems Analysis (Austria). Professor Emeritus of the University.
 Stanislav M. Nikolayenko, Head of the National University of Life and Environmental Sciences of Ukraine since 2014. Doctor of Pedagogical Sciences, Professor, Deputy of the Verkhovna Rada of Ukraine of 4 convocations, Minister of Education and Science of Ukraine in 2005–2007.
Victor O. Boiko, Honored Worker of Agriculture of Ukraine, Candidate of Sciences in Public Administration. Deputy of the Verkhovna Rada of Ukraine of the IV convocation, Deputy Minister of Agrarian Policy of Ukraine (2009), Minister of Environmental Protection of Ukraine (2010).
Dmytro O. Melnychuk,  Head of the National University of Life and Environmental Sciences of Ukraine (1984–2014), Doctor of Biological Sciences, Professor, Academician of the National Academy of Sciences of Ukraine and the National Academy of Agrarian Sciences of Ukraine. Hero of Ukraine.
Oleksandr O. Moroz, deputy of the Verkhovna Rada of Ukraine of 5 convocations, Chairman of the Verkhovna Rada of Ukraine (1994–1998, and 2006–2007). Co-founder of the Socialist Party of Ukraine.
Ivan S. Plyushch, twice Chairman of the Verkhovna Rada of Ukraine (1991–1994, 2000–2002). Member of the Verkhovna Rada of Ukraine of I, II, III, IV, V convocations, Secretary of the National Security and Defence Council of Ukraine (2007). Hero of Ukraine (2001wdawadadadawdad

References

External links 

 Official site
 Student NUBiP of Ukraine

 
Agricultural universities and colleges in Ukraine
Universities and colleges in Kyiv
1898 establishments in Ukraine
Educational institutions established in 1898
National universities in Ukraine
Institutions with the title of National in Ukraine